Ogmore Comprehensive school, formerly known as Ogmore Grammar School, was a secondary school located in the Bridgend County Borough in Wales, UK. Ogmore Comprehensive School's mottos was “Preparing Pupils for life". The school was established in 1972 and covered Year 7 to Year 13, ages 11 to 18 in the UK. The school colors were Navy Blue and Red, with coordinating navy blue colored uniforms. It closed in 2011.

School history

Ogmore Comprehensive School operated on the Valley site from 1972 to 1989 before moving to Bryncethin. Prior to this Ogmore Grammar School had been there from its formation in 1948 to 1972 when the Grammar School was merged with Nantymoel Secondary School to form the Comprehensive. 
The old Grammar Motto had been Fel Yr A Ymnertha (As it is Strengthened). School houses in the old Grammar were Tudor (Blue), Llewellyn (Green) and Glyndwr (Red). The Grammar School had been small (circa 350 pupils) with 2 forms per year and an Upper and Lower Sixth. Despite this small size the school regularly fielded a first and second 15 rugby team and was renowned for its netball teams.
Prior to the Grammar School it had been Ogmore Secondary School 1919 to 1948 and Ogmore Higher Elementary School 1910 to 1919). 

Higher Elementary School 

J. Davies Brown M.A.  Higher Elementary School, 14th Sep 1910 to 3rd Sep 1919. The new school cost £8,000 and could accommodate 250 pupils. First teachers: 

Lillian Armitage B.A., Lilian M. Davies B.A., Thomas Jacob Jones B.A., Thomas Samuel B.Sc., Miss E.M. Williams 

Mr T. Samuel Higher Elementary School, 4th Sep 1919 to 8th Sep 1919 
	
Mr Charles Davies B.Sc. Higher Elementary School, 9th Sep 1919 to 18th Sep 1919. Moved over from Fronwen Primary as Senior Master 

Thomas Jacob Jones, M.A., M.C. Higher Elementary School, 19th Sep 1919 to 20th Oct 1919 Thomas Jacob Jones temporarily in charge as Senior Master pending appointment of new Head 

Thomas Jacob Jones, M.A., M.C. Higher Elementary School 21st Oct 1919 to 01st Jan 1921 Thomas Jacob Jones officially appointed new Head. He is invested with Military Cross at Buckingham Palace on 31 Mar 1920. 

Ogmore Secondary School

Thomas Jacob Jones, M.A., M.C. Ogmore Secondary School, 01st Jan 1921 to 30th Apr 1948    

Austen M. Lewis, Ogmore Secondary School, 30th Apr 1948 to 01st Sep 1948   

Ogmore Grammar School

Austen M. Lewis, Ogmore Grammar School, 01-Sep-48 to 1954. On 08 Jul 1949, War Memorial & Roll of Honour unveiled. 

R. Protheroe, Ogmore Grammar School, 1954 to 1954   

Ezra Plummer, Ogmore Grammar School, 1954 to 1961   

W. J. Price, Ogmore Grammar School, 1961 1972

Ogmore Comprehensive School 
•	1972 saw the introduction of Comprehensive Education at Secondary level. Ogmore Grammar School became the Upper Comprehensive and Nantymoel Park School the Lower Comprehensive, until the new School was built at Brynmenyn. 

W. J. Price, Ogmore Comprehensive (Upper) School, 1972 to 1977. On 31st Mar 1977, the new Comprehensive School at Spout Hill, Bryncethin was officially opened and became the Ogmore Comprehensive Upper School. 

W. J. Price, Ogmore Comprehensive (Upper) School, 1977 Jul-79 In 1982, all pupils in the Lower Comprehensive moved to the old Grammar School site in Fairy Glen, whilst the Upper Comprehensive moved to the new school in Bryncethin. 

P. Manley, Ogmore Comprehensive (Lower) School and (Upper) School, 01-Sep-79 to 01-Feb-92 After 1985 both upper and Lower schools were re-united in the new school site at Bryncethin. 

Brian Davies Ogmore Comprehensive School, 16-Oct-91 to 31-Aug-92  

Mrs Sandra F. Davies, M.B.E. Ogmore Comprehensive School 01-Sep-92 to 31-Aug-03   

Nicholas Oaten, Ogmore Comprehensive School, 01-Sep-03 to 19-Apr-09 Left to join King Henry VIII Comprehensive School in Abergavenny due to uncertainty in regard to potential merger with Ynysawdre School 

Sue Halliwell, Ogmore Comprehensive School 20-Apr-09 to 01-Nov-09 Acting Head - Sue left at half term to take up a post at Estyn 

Gwyn P. Davies Ogmore Comprehensive School, 02-Nov-09 to Jul-11 Acting Head 

Andrew Warren Valleys Gateway School (as named by BCBC until new build complete). Apr-10 Sep-11 Head Designate 

Andrew Warren Coleg Cymunedol y Dderwen in Sep-11   became its first head

Many thanks to Ogmore Valley Local History Society who were the source for the Head Teachers listed above

Ogmore Comprehensive was a co-educational secondary school last situated approximately 1.2 miles from the M4 Junction 36, Bridgend, Wales on its Bryncethin base. It had a population of approximately 710 pupils aged 11–18 in its last year of full service, which made it the smallest secondary state school in Bridgend. The school was mainly recognised throughout South Wales for its commitments to the environment. In 2011, the school ceased to be after merging with local neighbouring school Ynysawdre Comprehensive School after over 100 years.

Notable former pupils

Hilary Floyd: Wales netball international and former PE teacher at Ogmore Comprehensive School

Keith Bradshaw: Wales international rugby union player. 

Gavin Thomas: former Welsh international rugby union flanker, who was capped 24 times for Wales. 

Gareth Thomas: nicknamed "Alfie", Welsh former professional rugby player, who represented Wales in both rugby union and rugby league. With 100 test match appearances he was the most capped Welsh rugby union player until he was overtaken by Stephen Jones in September 2011.

'Nathan Thomas: Welsh former international rugby union footballer who played in the back row.

Lynn Davies: Olympic gold medallist Lynn Davies CBE Welsh former track and field athlete who specialised in the long jump. He was the 1964 Olympic champion in the event. He was born in Nantymoel near Bridgend and was a member of the Cardiff Amateur Athletic Club

Ian Hamer, British former long-distance runner. He competed in the 1992 Summer Olympics. He was the bronze medallist in the 5000 metres at the 1990 Commonwealth Games. Club Swansea Harriers.

Windsor Davies (actor) was born in Canning Town, Essex, to Welsh parents, who returned to their native village of Nantymoel in 1940. Davies' best-known role was as Battery Sergeant Major Williams in the British sitcom It Ain't Half Hot Mum (1974–1981)

Beth Edwards - Award winning BBC news and sport journalist and producer. 

Bullet for My Valentine' members '''Michael Thomas''', '''Jason James''', '''Matthew Tuck''' and '''Michael Thomas'''.

Professor Peter John,Vice Chancellor of the University of West London and awarded CBE in 2019'

Sixth form partnership 

For many years, Ogmore School operated as a partnership with Ynysawdre in order for the two schools to offer a wider choice of subjects and opportunities to those pupils who chose to return for the sixth form. As a result, many pupils went back and for between the two schools due to some subjects only being available at their respective school.

Merge with "Ynysawdre" 2011 

As part of a multi-million project, the school merged with local neighbouring school Ynysawdre Comprehensive School to become a new school, known as "Coleg Cymunedol Y Dderwen" opening in September 2011. Both schools continued to see the number of pupils enrolling every year continue to drop, prompting firstly, the council to consider closing one of the 2 schools. However, in 2010, Bridgend County Borough Council, passed a vote and decided to merge the two schools coming into effect in September 2011. "Ogmore Comprehenisve School" officially had its last day of service on 21 July 2011, with the school itself, pupils and staff, past and present, holding an open day on the 19th.

Uniform 

School Uniform

Catchment area 
Ogmore School served the area of Ogmore Vale, Nantymoel, Bryncethin, Sarn, Blackmill, Lewistown, Pricetown and Wyndham. Whereas the old Grammar School saw its catchment area cover Litchard and Coity (for girls) and Pencoed and Heol Y Cyw for boys and girls. The new school will continue to serve these catchment areas along with picking up Ynysawdre Comprehensive School's areas such as Tondu and the Blaengarw valley along with others. Housing developments within these catchment areas is also expected to keep increasing the number of pupils enrolling in the school year after year, this being one of the major reasons for the new school.

References

External links 
 The ITV video can be seen here.
 Ogmore Schools Website
 Ogmore Eco Schools Website

Defunct schools in Bridgend County Borough
Educational institutions established in 1972
Educational institutions disestablished in 2011
Fair trade schools
1972 establishments in Wales
2011 disestablishments in Wales